Iuka Springs is an extinct town in St. Clair County, in the U.S. state of Missouri. The GNIS classifies it as a populated place. 

The community is located on Reid Creek along Missouri Route M approximately 12 miles west-northwest of Osceola and 19 miles south-southwest of Clinton.

Iuka Springs was platted in 1879. A post office called Iuka Springs was established in 1887, and remained in operation until 1903. According to tradition, "Iuka" was the name of a local Indian. Variant names were "Blakelys Mill" and "Boots Mill".

References

Ghost towns in Missouri
Former populated places in St. Clair County, Missouri